Franz Vogler (born 15 August 1944 in Oberstdorf) is a German former alpine skier who competed in the 1968 Winter Olympics and 1972 Winter Olympics.

External links
 

1944 births
Living people
German male alpine skiers
Olympic alpine skiers of West Germany
Alpine skiers at the 1968 Winter Olympics
Alpine skiers at the 1972 Winter Olympics
Universiade medalists in alpine skiing
People from Oberstdorf
Sportspeople from Swabia (Bavaria)
Universiade bronze medalists for West Germany
Competitors at the 1966 Winter Universiade
Competitors at the 1968 Winter Universiade
Competitors at the 1970 Winter Universiade
Competitors at the 1972 Winter Universiade
20th-century German people